The China Championship is a ranking snooker tournament held since 2016 in China.

Winners

References

 
Snooker ranking tournaments
Snooker competitions in China
Recurring sporting events established in 2016
2016 establishments in China
Sports competitions in Guangzhou